Rain Fire is the third album by vocalist David Oliver.

Track listing
Could It Be Love 		
Summer Love 		
Don't You Ever Be Lonely 		
I Keep Looking For A Better Way 		
Rusty O' Halo 		
Never Seen A Girl Like You 		
Puppets On A String 		
Private Tonight 		
I Remember You When 		
Spinnin' Round In Circles

Charts

References

External links
 David Oliver-Rain Fire at Discogs

1979 albums
David Oliver (singer) albums
Mercury Records albums
Albums produced by Wayne Henderson (musician)